Notes from the Underground is a creative writing free newspaper. Its first issue was distributed on the London Underground and in shops and libraries throughout London on 17 December 2007. It aims to function as a quality alternative free newspaper to those on the tube.  It was inspired by the success of The London Paper, but aims to be an entertaining and accessible platform for up-and-coming writers and illustrators.

Content

Stories 
Most of the stories are by new writers, though several more famous authors have written new stories for the paper. These include The Dreams of Bethany Mellmoth by William Boyd, Feed Me by Russell Brand, The Changeover by Mark Watson, The Grand Mal by Richard Milward. There are also stories of one sentence, including one by crime writer Peter James.

Illustration 
There are several cartoon strips, stand-alone cartoons as well as a new illustration for each story.

Distribution 
Notes from the Underground was distributed outside 35 central London tube stations as well as in branches of Foyles, selected branches of HMV and Waterstone's, public libraries and independent bookshops.

Criticism

Today programme report 
Notes from the Underground was discussed on the BBC Today programme by John Sutherland and Peter James on 17 December 2007. Sutherland agreed with James that "everything in the paper is worth reading", but felt the newspaper was pitched too highly compared to other free newspapers. "It might work, but I think the title is an allusion to the Dostoevsky book Notes from Underground, which I suspect would probably go over the heads of most commuters." However he did add that "this is a very good platform for new literature, and I am all in favour of it. More power to it, I say."

References

External links 
 Official website
 Video showing the design process

London newspapers
Free daily newspapers
London Underground in popular culture